Golgin A8 family member B is a protein that in humans is encoded by the GOLGA8B gene.

References

Further reading